Éric Lucas (born May 29, 1971) is a Canadian former professional boxer.

Professional career

Lucas turned pro in 1991 and came up short in his first two title shots, against WBC Light Heavyweight Title holder Fabrice Tiozzo in 1996 and IBF Super Middleweight Title holder Roy Jones Jr. later that year. He lost the fight to Jones after Jones had played a basketball game earlier that day. Lucas won the WBC title from Briton Glenn Catley in 2001. He defended it three times before losing a controversial split decision to Markus Beyer in Germany in April 2003.

Eric Lucas, a former WBC super-middleweight world champion, announced his retirement following a 10th-round TKO loss to WBA super-middleweight champion Mikkel Kessler in Copenhagen. His career record stands at 38-7-3, 14 knockouts. Lucas is now the president of InterBox, a boxing promotion company which also employs his former trainer Stéphan Larouche.

Lucas came back to the ring in Montreal on December 11, 2009, winning against Ramon Pedro Moyabo by KO in the 4th round. He subsequently faced Librado Andrade on May 28, 2010, in Quebec City. Lucas fought gallantly, but due to a deep cut near his left eye, the fight was stopped just before the 9th round was to begin. This loss marked the end to an 18-year boxing career, the fight occurring just one day before his 39th birthday.

Professional boxing record

See also
List of world super-middleweight boxing champions

References

External links

 

 

|-

|-

1971 births
Living people
Canadian male boxers
Boxers from Montreal
Light-heavyweight boxers
World super-middleweight boxing champions
World Boxing Council champions
Truck drivers